The United States ambassador to Palau is the official representative of the president of the United States to the head of state of Palau.

Until 1994 Palau had been a part of the United Nations Trust Territory of the Pacific Islands, administered by the United States. On May 25, 1994, the United Nations Security Council ended the trusteeship for the Palau district, and Palau became independent on October 1, 1994. The U.S. recognized Palau on the same day. Diplomatic relations between the U.S. and Palau were established on December 6, 1996, when U.S. Ambassador to the Philippines Thomas C. Hubbard was concurrently accredited to Palau and presented his credentials; he remained resident at Manila. The ambassadors to the Philippines continued to represent the U.S. until October 10, 2004, when the U.S. Embassy in Koror was established, with Deborah L. Kingsland as Chargé d’Affaires. The first ranking ambassador was commissioned to Koror in 2010.

Ambassadors and chiefs of mission

Notes

See also
Palau – United States relations
Foreign relations of Palau
Ambassadors of the United States

References
United States Department of State: Background notes on Palau

External links
 United States Department of State: Chiefs of Mission for Palau
 United States Department of State: Palau
 United States Embassy in Koror

Palau

United States